Schutzbach is a municipality in the district of Altenkirchen, in Rhineland-Palatinate, in western Germany. It is home to the pipe manufacturer Krah AG.

References

Altenkirchen (district)